KF Korabi (FK Korabi or known by its old name as ФК Кораб, FK Korab) is a football club based in Debar, North Macedonia. They are currently competing in the Macedonian Third League (Southwest Division).

History
The club was founded in 1921.

They won the Macedonian Third League West title in the 2010–11 season.

Korabi are the winter champions and in first place for the first half of the 2017–18 season.

Korabi won the 2017-2018 Third league Southwest and received automatic promotion to the Macedonian Second League West for 2018–19.

Current squad

References

External links
 
Club info at MacedonianFootball 
Football Federation of Macedonia 

Korabi
Association football clubs established in 1921
1921 establishments in Yugoslavia
FK
Korabi